KKOG-TV, UHF analog channel 16, was an independent television station licensed to Ventura, California, United States. It was the first full power broadcast station in Ventura County. The station had a brief history, lasting only nine months. Starting up on December 14, 1968 at 2:15 p.m., KKOG offered live, local programming instead of the normal syndicated programming most independents offered. KKOG's primary owner was Julian F. Myers, a noted Hollywood talent agent and publicist. Myers hosted several of the station's TV programs.

Newscast titles
KKOGed In News (December 14, 1968–February 2, 1969)
Instant News, Sports and Weather (February 2, 1969–February 23, 1969)
16 News (February 23, 1969–September 13, 1969)

Programming

KKOG's all-live, all-local program schedule meant that many shows came and went fairly quickly during its history. Using published schedules in the Ventura County Star-Free Press and the station's promotional literature, programs which aired at some point in the station's history included:

 Because - Opinionated quiz show
 Country Music - Local country-western bands such as "Leroy Motley and His Melody Mixers", "Curtis Tate and the Broncos", "Chief Big and the Scalp Hunters"
 Hollywood and You - Hollywood professionals, one from in front of the camera and the other from behind it, are quizzed by a panel of local residents
 KKOG-In Party - Dancing to pop music
 New Horizons - A look at high school and collegiate campus life
 Prince Gary's Kingdom of KKOG - Local actor Gary Dyer entertains before a live audience of local children, reads stories, plays games, etc.
 Prizes and Surprises - Local variety acts, contests and giveaways
 Sand and Sea - Weekly surfing and ocean sports program hosted by Ventura Port District general manager William Kerrigan
 Sí Sixteen - The culture of the Spanish-speaking population, hosted by Ventura College educator Dr. Frank Maggipinto
 Stock Market Observations - Market news and analysis by local stock broker John McGowan
 You Americans - Foreign correspondents assigned to the American beat tell how they view America

Descriptions came from the source material.  In addition to the Ventura County Star Free Press, KKOG's programing schedule was also listed in TV Guide and the TV Times supplement to the Los Angeles Times. The extensive listings of the station's programming was unable to save the station.

The failure of KKOG
Channel 16 broadcast its final programming on September 13, 1969. The station failed for the following reasons:

1) The station, like most UHF stations at the time, had a low ERP (effective radiated power). While many UHF stations now broadcast with 2 to 5 million watts, KKOG had only around 349,500 watts of power, limiting its coverage area.

2) The transmitter for KKOG was on Red Mountain, between Ventura and Ojai. This meant TV antennas pointed toward Mount Wilson near Los Angeles could either not receive KKOG, or received it poorly, since Red Mountain was behind the antenna's aimed direction.

3) Cable television was primarily used to provide over the air signals at the time, basically to communities blocked off from TV signals. While KKOG was carried on all the cable TV systems in Ventura County and in Santa Barbara, most people who could receive signals from the Los Angeles stations' Mount Wilson transmitters were not cable subscribers.

4) While the TV networks were already broadcasting full color prime time programming and many Los Angeles independents, including other UHF stations, had some color programs, KKOG was still showing its entire schedule in black and white.

5) The owners did not anticipate the operating costs of the station until advertising revenue could build in the market. Therefore, when funds dried up, the cash-strapped station was forced to close down. The primary investor in the station pulled out only six weeks into the station's operation, forcing it to operate with an entirely volunteer staff for most of its history.

Ultimately, the channel 16 frequency was transferred from television usage in Ventura to mobile radio usage in Los Angeles. Ventura County would eventually get a new local TV station in 1985, when KTIE-TV, channel 63 in Oxnard (now KBEH) signed on. In 1990, KSTV (now KJLA) signed on the air on channel 57 in Ventura. Both stations have since moved their studios and primary attention away from Ventura County and into the more lucrative Los Angeles television market.

External links
 KKOG-TV: An experiment in local, live television (tribute site)
 Broadcasting 101: KKOG
 Radio-Info: Article on KKOG's programming (From a Google cache; Click here for Radio-Info today)

KOG-TV
Defunct television stations in the United States
Television channels and stations established in 1968
1968 establishments in California
Television channels and stations disestablished in 1969
1969 disestablishments in California
KOG-TV